Star Fury or Starfury or variant, may refer to:

 Space Empires: Starfury, a 2003 videogame set in the Space Empires universe
 Starfury, a military spacecraft in the Babylon 5 franchise

See also

 Fury (disambiguation)
 Star (disambiguation)